Daniel Danilović (born July 25, 1988) is a retired professional tennis player who formerly represented Serbia and Montenegro, Montenegro and most recently Sweden.

ITF Futures titles

Singles: (1)
{|
|-valign=top
|

Doubles: (13)
{|
|-valign=top
|

References

External links
 
 
 

Montenegrin male tennis players
Swedish male tennis players
Living people
1988 births
Tennis players from Stockholm
Mediterranean Games silver medalists for Montenegro
Competitors at the 2009 Mediterranean Games
Mediterranean Games medalists in tennis
Serbia and Montenegro male tennis players